The Hartheim killing centre (sometimes translated as "Hartheim killing facility" or "Hartheim euthanasia centre") was a killing facility involved in the Nazi programme known as Aktion T4, in which German citizens deemed mentally or physically unfit were systematically murdered with poison gas. Often, these patients were transferred from other killing facilities such as the Am Spiegelgrund clinic in Vienna. This was initially a programme of "involuntary euthanasia" permitted under the law ostensibly to enable the lawful and painless killing of incurably ill patients; these murders continued even after the law was rescinded in 1942. Other victims included Jews, Communists and those considered undesirable by the state. Concentration camp inmates who were unfit for work, or otherwise deemed troublesome, were also executed here. The facility was housed in Hartheim Castle in the municipality of Alkoven, near Linz, Austria, which now is a memorial site and documentation centre.

Hartheim statistics 
In June 1945, during investigations by US Forces into the former gassing facility at Hartheim, the American investigating officer Charles Dameron broke open a steel safe in which the Hartheim statistics were found.  This was a 39-page brochure produced for the internal purposes of the Nazi "euthanasia" programme (Aktion T4), and contained monthly statistics of the gassing of mentally and physically handicapped patients (called "disinfection" in the document) carried out in the six killing centres on the territory of the Reich.  In 1968 and 1970 an ex-employee of the establishment revealed, as a witness, that he had to compile the material at the end of 1942. The Hartheim statistics included a page on which it was calculated that "disinfecting 70,273 people with a life expectation of 10 years" had saved food in the value of 141,775,573.80 Reichsmarks.

Victims of the first extermination phase in Hartheim 

According to the Hartheim statistics, a total of 18,269 people were murdered in the gas chamber at Hartheim in the period of 16 months between May 1940 and 1 September 1941:

These statistics only cover the first extermination phase of the Nazi's euthanasia programme, Action T4, which was brought to an end by Hitler's order dated 24 August 1941 after protests by the Roman Catholic Church.

In all it is estimated that a total of 30,000 people were murdered at Hartheim. Among those killed were sick and disabled persons as well as prisoners from concentration camps. The killings were carried out by carbon monoxide poisoning.

14f13 "Special Treatment" 
Just three days after the formal end of Action T4, a lorry arrived at Hartheim with 70 Jewish inmates from Mauthausen concentration camp who were subsequently executed there. The Hartheim killing centre achieved a special notoriety, not just because it was where the largest number of patients were gassed, but because as part of Action 14f13 Hartheim was also the institution in which the most concentration camp prisoners were executed. Their numbers are estimated at 12,000.

Prisoners at Mauthausen who were no longer capable of working, especially in the quarries, and politically undesirable prisoners were brought to Hartheim to be executed. In the papers these transfers were disguised with terms like "recreation leave". The entries under "sickness" included "German-haters", "communist" or "Polish fanatic". From 1944 on, the prisoners were no longer selected by T4 doctors; the objective was simply to gain space in the Mauthausen camp quickly. Other transports came from the concentration camp of Gusen, and probably also from Ravensbrück during 1944, made up of women inmates who were predominantly tuberculosis sufferers and those deemed mentally infirm.

Execution doctors 
The Action T4 organisers, Viktor Brack and Karl Brandt, ordered that the execution of the sick had to be carried out by medical doctors because Hitler's memorandum of authorisation of 1 September 1939 only referred to doctors. The operation of the gas tap was thus the responsibility of doctors in the death centres. However, during the course of the programme, the gas valves were occasionally operated by others in the absence of the doctors or for other reasons. Also, many doctors used pseudonyms rather than their real names in the documents.

The following death doctors worked in Hartheim:
 Head: Rudolf Lonauer: 1 April 1940 to April 1945
 Deputy head: Georg Renno: May 1940 to February 1945

Niedernhart station 
The Action T4 killing centres had intermediate stations for victims. Many lorries carrying victims to their destination at Hartheim went via the Niedernhart Mental Institute in Linz, where Rudolf Lonauer was the senior doctor, as he was in Hartheim. There, hundreds of victims were killed, mainly by lethal injection. For the Action T4 patients were screened and categorised, then a bus was filled with the victims and driven to Hartheim.

Move of T4 to Hartheim and Weissenbach am Attersee 
In August 1943, due to allied bombing of Berlin, the head office for the National Socialist Euthanasia Programme was moved from Tiergartenstrasse 4, Berlin, to the Ostmark region, which was then humorously described as the air raid shelter of the Reich. The statistic and documents by Paul Nitsche, correspondence, notices and reports were taken to Hartheim (office department, accounts office) and the Schoberstein Recreation Centre near Weißenbach am Attersee (medical department).

Victims

Well-known victims 

 Maria Karoline von Sachsen Coburg und Gotha, Austrian princess (1899–1941)
  (1903–1942), German Roman Catholic priest
  (1895–1942), Austrian Roman Catholic priest
 Jan Kowalski (1871–1942), Polish bishop of the Catholic Mariavite Church
  (1894–1941), Austrian artist
 Gottfried Neunhäuserer (1882–1941), Austrian Benedictine father
 Friederike (Friedl) Roth, née Reichler (1900–1940), widow of writer Joseph Roth
  (1893–1942), Protestant theologian
 Aloisia Veit (1891–1940), second cousin of Adolf Hitler

Clergy 
A total of 310 Polish, seven German, six Czech, four Luxemburg, three Dutch and two Belgian priests were murdered. Many of them were transported from the Priest's Block in Dachau concentration camp. The chaplain, Hermann Scheipers, was also moved to the Invalid's Block, in order to be taken to Hartheim. Scheiper's sister—who stayed in contact by letter—tracked down a certain Dr. Bernsdorf, employee of the RSHA Berlin-Oranienburg, who was responsible for the clergy imprisoned in the Priest's Block. She confronted him and stated that, in Münsterland, it was an open secret that imprisoned priests were sent to the gas chamber. Bernsdorf apparently became very nervous during the discussion and telephoned the Commandant's Office at Dachau. Scheipers reported that it was on that same day, the 13 August 1942, that there was a response: he and three other German clergymen were moved from the Invalid's Block (where the SS assembled prisoners for onward transportation) back to the Priest's Block.

Hartheim T4 staff 

 Erwin Lambert: master bricklayer, oversaw construction of the crematorium and gas chambers
 : head Nazi euthanasia doctor in Hartheim, Niedernhart Mental Asylum in Linz and Geschwend Castle in Neuhofen an der Krems
 Vinzenz Nohel: worker, "burner"
 Franz Reichleitner: criminal policeman, management; was later commandant of Sobibor extermination camp
 : psychiatrist, deputy head Nazi euthanasia doctor
 Anton Schrottmayer: care worker, suicide
 Franz Stangl: criminal policeman, Gestapo official, deputy office manager; was later camp commandant of Sobibor and Treblinka
 Karl Steubel: senior care worker, suicide
 : worker, "burner", later overseer at Sobibor extermination camp
 Gustav Wagner: was later deputy commandant at Sobibor extermination camp
 Christian Wirth: criminal commissar, office manager; was later commandant in Belzec extermination camp
 Paul Bredow: later worked at Treblinka
 Bruno Kochan: male nurse
Kochan and at least 14 others employees involved in an amateur scheme to using fraudulent letters to enrich themselves. In August 1942, Kochan was arrested by the Gestapo for embezzlement. He had used forged papers to impersonate a police officer and to enrich himself. He and his accomplices had used various forged documents to obtain special privileges, including free travel on the railroad and free deck chairs at the beach. Kochan also used the papers to convince Jews that he could get them exit visas for money. All of these things posed the threat of exposing the operation.

Kochan was not allowed to defend himself during his trial and the judges could not ask questions. He was sentenced to death on 10 February 1943. Kochan, 35, was guillotined at Plötzensee Prison on 16 March 1943.

Those chiefly responsible for recruiting the lower-ranking staff, according to witness statements, were the two Gau inspectors, Stefan Schachermayr (1912–2008) and Franz Peterseil (1907–1991), as well as Adolf Gustav Kaufmann (1902–1974), head of the inspection department of the T4 central office in Berlin.

See also 
 Schloss Hartheim
 Am Spiegelgrund clinic

References

Sources 
 . Table of contents.
 . Summary online.
 
 . Summary.
 Walter Kohl: Die Pyramiden von Hartheim. Euthanasie in Oberösterreich 1940 bis 1945. Edition Geschichte der Heimat. Steinmaßl, Grünbach, 1997, . – Table of contents.
 Walter Kohl: "Ich fühle mich nicht schuldig". Georg Renno, Euthanasiearzt. Paul-Zsolnay-Verlag, Vienna, 2000, .
 Kurt Leininger: Verordnetes Sterben – verdrängte Erinnerungen. NS-Euthanasie in Schloss Hartheim. Verlagshaus der Ärzte, Vienna, 2006, .
 Tom Matzek: Das Mordschloss. Auf den Spuren von NS-Verbrechen in Schloss Hartheim. 1. Auflage. Kremayr & Scheriau, Vienna, 2002, . (Description of contents).
 Johannes Neuhauser (ed.): Hartheim – wohin unbekannt. Briefe & Dokumente. Publication P No 1 – Bibliothek der Provinz. Bibliothek der Provinz, Weitra, 1992, .
 Franz Rieger: Schattenschweigen oder Hartheim. Roman. (Zeitkritischer Roman). Styria, Graz (u.a.) 1985, ..
 Jean-Marie Winkler, Gazage de concentrationnaires au château de Hartheim. L'action 14f13 en Autriche annexée. Nouvelles recherches sur la comptabilité de la mort, éditions Tirésias - Michel Reynaud, Paris, 2010
Other literature see main article: Nazi Euthanasia Programme or Action T4

Audio and video 
 Tom Matzek: Das Mordschloss. Eine Dokumentation über die Gräuel in Schloss Hartheim. TV programme by ORF, 2001, Brennpunkt. 1 videocassette (VHS, ca. 45 minutes). S. n., s. l. 2001.

Footnote to "Audio and video"

External links 

 Euthanasia Centre 1940–1944 at Hartheim Castle Memorial Site
 Mühldorf History Society – Information on the residents of the Ecksberg Handicapped Centre, who were executed at Hartheim (in German)

Aktion T4 euthanasia centres
Mauthausen concentration camp
History of Upper Austria
Austria in World War II
Holocaust locations in Austria
Dachau concentration camp
Ravensbrück concentration camp